The Chile de árbol (Spanish for tree chili is a small and potent Mexican chili pepper also known as bird's beak chile and rat's tail chile. Their heat index is between 15,000 and 30,000 Scoville units. The peppers start out green and turn a bright red color as they mature. Chile de árbol peppers can be found fresh, dried, or powdered. As dried chiles, they are often used to decorate wreaths because they do not lose their red color after dehydration.

See also
List of Capsicum cultivars

References

Chili peppers
Capsicum cultivars